A Bobby Car is a toy car designed for children from the age of around twelve months. The Classic model is red, made of plastic and is about 60 cm long and 40 cm high. It has four wheels. The car has been produced by the BIG company since 1972 at sites in Fürth and Burghaslach in Germany. After the death of the Bobby Car inventor Ernst A. Bettag in 2003, the Simba Dickie Group took over the company. The name Bobby Car is protected. Since 2005, a new Bobby Car has been produced for which the Classic design was revised.

Bobby car for children 

The Bobby Car was invented in order to help children learn to walk. It has a kind of seat in which the child can sit as on a motorcycle. By swinging their legs, the child can move the car. Today, numerous accessories exist such as connecting rods, light running tires, trailer and so on. As well as being manufactured in different colours, it also comes in variants such as a police car or tow truck. Special editions have been made to honour well-known German cars, such as Mercedes-Benz SLK, Audi TT, Smart and Volkswagen Beetle. In cooperation with tire manufacturer Fulda, a model having real tires, rather than the usual hard plastic variety was produced.

Bobby Car Racing 
In the 1990s another use of Bobby Cars emerged: Professional competitive driving. The plastic body is strong enough to carry an adult. The steering element and the axles are strengthened to handle high speeds (approximately 60 km/h). Competitions are held on closed roads with steep downward gradients.

The official world speed record of a modified gravity-powered Bobby Car was set on 28 May 2022 by Marcel Paul from the Bobby Car Club Altenhain / Bad Soden, who achieved a speed of 130.72 km/h.
The speed record in the second discipline with a classic bobby car with plastic tires at 106.01 km/h was also set by Marcel Paul. The Record Institute for Germany has recognized both top values.

References

Toy cars and trucks
Toy brands